Vive en mí is the ninth studio album by the Mexican pop singer Mijares. This album was released on 9 August 1994. It was produced by Oscar López and recorded in New York. The album includes some covers of Italian songs, and some famous songwriters provides his themes like Pablo Milanés, Lolita de la Colina, Renato Mares, Luis Gomez Escolar and Gerardo Flores.

Track listing
Tracks[]:
 "Vive en mí"
 "La quiero a morir"
 "Amor"
 "Como duele"
 "Para los dos"
 "Calorías"
 "Alma fria"
 "Para vivir"
 "Llévame"
 "Amarte a ti"
 "Conocerte fue un placer"
 "Lluvia de amor"
 "Lola"

Singles
 "Vive en mí" #2 México (Music video directed by Daniel Gruener)
 "Amor" #1 México (Music video directed by Daniel Gruener)
 "Como Duele Perder" #5 México (no video)
 "Alma Fría" #10 México

Single charts

1994 albums
Manuel Mijares albums